Pseudopsocus fusciceps is a species of Psocoptera from Elipsocidae family that can be found in Austria, Belgium, Finland, Germany, Great Britain, Greece, Norway, Poland, Spain, Sweden, and the Netherlands.

References 

Elipsocidae
Insects described in 1893
Psocoptera of Europe